Calamus moti is a climbing rainforest plant in the palm family Arecaceae, which is endemic to Queensland. It has a slim flexible stem which does not support the plant, instead it climbs to the forest canopy with the assistance of long tendrils armed with stout recurved hooks.

Description
The underside of the rachis has three longitudinal rows of stout recurved hooks.

Flagella armed with stout recurved barbs are produced from the leaf sheath and act as grappling hooks  providing support for the flexible stem.

On older sections of the stem the fronds and their leaf sheaths fall away, revealing the stem's smooth glossy green surface.

Taxonomy
Calamus moti was first described by Frederick Manson Bailey and published in 1896 in the journal Bulletin of the Department of Agriculture, Brisbane.

Etymology
The genus name Calamus is derived from Ancient Greek κάλαμος (kálamos) and means reed or cane. The species epithet moti is the name for this plant in the language of the Djabugay people of the Barron River.

Distribution and habitat
C. moti is endemic to Queensland, ranging from near Cooktown southwards to around Mackay.

Ecology and uses
The yellow lawyer cane is the host plant for the white-fringed swift Sabera fuliginosa, a butterfly of the family Hesperiidae, and the fruits are eaten by birds.

Indigenous communities of north Queensland ate the fruits and the young shoots, while the cane from the stem was used for many purposes including axe handles, fish and animal traps, shelters and baskets.

Conservation
This species is listed by the Queensland Department of Environment and Science as least concern. , it has not been assessed by the IUCN.

Gallery

References

External links
 
 
 View a map of recorded sightings of Calamus moti at the Australasian Virtual Herbarium
 See images of Calamus moti on Flickriver

moti
Plants described in 1896
Endemic flora of Queensland
Taxa named by Frederick Manson Bailey